Sebuzín is a village, one of the districts of the city of Ústí nad Labem, Czech Republic. The hills Krkavčí skála, Varhošť, Trabice and Deblík are in the surrounding area.

History 
The first mention of Sebuzín was in 1251. The name is derived from Slavonic name Chcebud. Sebuzín was a liege village, which was despoiled during the 30 Years War. The first mention of the school in the village was in 1774. Most of houses where destroyed by a big fire in 1827. In 1855, a cholera epidemic spread. The main livelihood of the inhabitants is in growing fruit trees (cherries, apricots, apples, peaches, pears) and exporting it to Germany down the River Labe. Sebuzín was part of the town of Litoměřice until 1960.

Historic sites 

The Baroque chapel of St. Vincent Ferrer is situated upon the village square in the centre of the village. It is a registered national landmark protected by the state. It was built in 1745. There is a sculpture in the niche and an iron bell in the pinnacle.

References

External links 
Sebuzin Map at Maplandia.com

Populated places in Ústí nad Labem District
Neighbourhoods in the Czech Republic
Ústí nad Labem